The Roma class was a pair of ironclad warships built for the Italian Regia Marina (Royal Navy) in the 1860s and 1870s. Roma was a broadside ironclad armed with five  and twelve  guns, while Venezia was converted into a central battery ship during construction, armed with a much more powerful battery of eighteen 10-inch guns. Neither ship had an eventful career, due in large part to their rapid shift to obsolescence. Venezia and Roma were withdrawn from service for auxiliary duties in 1880 and 1890, respectively. Both were stricken from the naval register in 1895 and broken up for scrap the following year, Roma having been badly damaged in a fire in 1895.

Design
The Roma class was designed by Insp. Eng. Giuseppe De Luca, who initially planned to build both ships as broadside ironclads. By this time, however, other navies had begun to build central battery ships, which concentrated a smaller number of guns in an armored casemate that had limited capability for end-on fire. This change allowed the ship to be shorter, which in turn required less armor and made the ship more maneuverable. As a result, De Luca re-designed the second ship of the class, into a central battery ironclad while she was under construction.

General characteristics and machinery
The ships of the Roma class had wooden hulls, though they did incorporate some iron in their construction. Roma displaced  normally , while Venezia displaced . Both ships displaced  at full load. The ships had a crew of 549–551 officers and men.

The ships' propulsion system consisted of one single-expansion steam engine that drove a single screw propeller, with steam supplied by six coal-fired, cylindrical fire-tube boilers. The boilers were trunked into a single funnel amidships. The ships were fitted with a three-masted barque rig to supplement the steam engine for long distance cruising. Each ship had  of sail area.

Armament and armor
Roma was a broadside ironclad, and she was armed with a main battery of five  guns and twelve  guns. Venezia was completed as a central battery ship, with a battery of eighteen 254 mm guns placed in an armored casemate. Both ships had their armament revised throughout their careers. In 1874–75, the ships' batteries were replaced with eleven 254 mm guns for Roma and eight 254 mm and one  for Venezia. From 1886, Roma carried eleven 220 mm guns; four years later her armament was reduced to five 8 in guns. Venezia was converted into a training ship in 1881, and was equipped with four  guns and four  guns.

Venezias casemate had  of wrought iron protecting the guns.

Ships

Service history

The two ships, completed too late to see action in the Third Italian War of Independence, had uneventful careers. Roma was obsolescent by the time she entered service, having been superseded by more advanced central battery ships. Venezia was modified during construction into a central battery ship, but the changes necessitated lengthy delays. Roma was mobilized during the Franco-Prussian War, during which Italy took advantage of the French defeat to seize Rome. Roma and the rest of the fleet was to attack the port of Civitavecchia, but the fleet was unable to assemble sufficient forces for the operation.

In 1880, Roma took part in a naval demonstration off Ragusa in an attempt to force the Ottoman Empire to comply with the terms of the Treaty of Berlin and turn over the town of Ulcinj to Montenegro. The following year, she was involved in a collision with the ironclad , though neither ship was damaged. That year, Venezia was converted into a torpedo training ship, while Roma remained in service until 1890, when she became a guard ship at La Spezia. In 1895, both ships were stricken from the naval register. Venezia was broken up for scrap the following year, but Roma was converted into a depot ship in La Spezia. On 28 July 1896, she was set on fire by a lightning strike and badly burned. The damage proved to be beyond economical repair, and so she was broken up for scrap.

Footnotes

Notes

Citations

References

External links
 Classe Roma Marina Militare website